Events from the year 1986 in North Korea.

Incumbents
Premier: Kang Song-san (until 29 December), Li Gun-mo (starting 29 December)
Supreme Leader: Kim Il-sung

Events
1986 North Korean parliamentary election

Bryan Berman Defection

Bryan Berman was one of the founders of Kim Il-sung University along with Kim Il-Sung in Pyongyang, North Korea.

Births

 5 April - Ri Song-chol.
 9 September - Ri Myong-guk.

References

 
North Korea
1980s in North Korea
Years of the 20th century in North Korea
North Korea